Store Fornestinden is a mountain in Tromsø Municipality in Troms og Finnmark county, Norway. The highest peak of any mountain in the eastern part of the municipality. The mountain is on the southern shore of the Kjosen fjord, an arm of the large Ullsfjorden.

The mountain is located in the Lyngen Alps, part of the Scandinavian Mountains.

References

External links
 

Tromsø
Mountains of Troms og Finnmark